Byron Township is one of sixteen townships in Buchanan County, Iowa, United States.  As of the 2000 census, its population was 1,063. Byron Township was organized in 1856.

Geography 

According to the USGS, it contains three cemeteries: Byron, Fairview and Payne. The former townsite of Doris also lies in the township.

References

External links 

 City-Data.com

Townships in Buchanan County, Iowa
Townships in Iowa
1856 establishments in Iowa
Populated places established in 1856